Rudka may refer to:

Czech Republic
Rudka (Brno-Country District)

Poland
In Greater Poland Voivodeship (west-central Poland):
Rudka, Czarnków-Trzcianka County
Rudka, Szamotuły County
In Lesser Poland Voivodeship (southern Poland):
Rudka, Gmina Wierzchosławice 
Rudka, Gmina Wojnicz
In Łódź Voivodeship (central Poland):
Rudka, Radomsko County
Rudka, Rawa County
In Lublin Voivodeship (eastern Poland):
Rudka, Gmina Chełm
Rudka, Gmina Ruda-Huta
Rudka, Krasnystaw County
Rudka, Tomaszów Lubelski County
In Masovian Voivodeship (east-central Poland):
Rudka, Łosice County 
Rudka, Mińsk County 
In Podlaskie Voivodeship (north-eastern Poland):
Rudka, Bielsk County
Rudka, Sokółka County
In Pomeranian Voivodeship (northern Poland):
Rudka, Pomeranian Voivodeship 
In Subcarpathian Voivodeship (south-eastern Poland):
Rudka, Subcarpathian Voivodeship
In Świętokrzyskie Voivodeship (south-central Poland):
Rudka, Końskie County 
Rudka, Ostrowiec County 
In Warmian-Masurian Voivodeship (north Poland):
Rudka, Warmian-Masurian Voivodeship

Ukraine
Rudka, a village in Babyn, Chernivtsi Oblast
 Rudka, a river in Ukraine, a tributary of Psel River
 Rudka, a river in Ukraine, a tributary of Styr River

See also
 Rudky, a city in Sambir Raion, Lviv Oblast, Ukraine